Luca and Loraine Baricchi are professional ballroom dancers and dance teachers from the Republic of Ireland & Italy. They twice won the Professional World Ballroom Dance Championship (1999, 2001). The couple also won the International Professional Standard Championship in London in 1999–2000, and are former British Open, UK and European champions. After regaining the World title in 2001, they decided to retire from competitive dancing.

Luca Baricchi was born in Reggio Emilia, Italy. Loraine was born Loraine Barry in Dublin, Republic of Ireland. They continue to teach dance in London, Italy and in Loraine's sister's studio in Tampa, Florida.

The Baricchis had married and started dancing together in 1993. The previous partner of Luca was Amanda Owen and Loraine's was Andrew Sinkinson (both couples split in 1993).

References

British ballroom dancers
Dance teachers
Married couples
Living people
Year of birth missing (living people)